King Middle School may refer to any of the following middle schools:

 Thomas Starr King Middle School of Los Angeles, California
 King Middle School (Portland, Maine) of Portland, Maine
 King Middle School (Milton, Florida) of Milton, Florida
 King Middle School (Portland, Oregon) of Portland, Oregon
 King Middle School (Atlanta) of Atlanta, Georgia
 Kenneth D. King Middle School (Harrodsburg, Kentucky) of Harrodsburg, Kentucky
 Martin Luther King Middle School (Berkeley), a public school in Berkeley, California